The William Shelton House is a historic house at 40 Pleasant Street in Windsor, Connecticut.  Built in 1830, it is a good local example of transitional Federal-Greek Revival architecture executed in brick.  It was listed on the National Register of Historic Places in 1988.

Description and history
The William Shelton House is located northwest of Windsor center, at the southwest corner of Pleasant and East Streets.  It is a -story masonry structure, built out of red brick with stone trim.  It is covered by a side gable roof, with two interior chimneys rising through the roof ridge.  The main facade is three bays wide, with a center entrance topped by a transom window.  The  windows are set in rectangular openings, with cut stone sills and lintels.  The side gables ends are pedimented, with half-round windows set in the gable.  A single-story gabled brick ell extends to the right.

The house was built in 1830 by William Shelton.  The bricks for its construction came from the brickyard of William Mack, which was located at the foot of Pleasant Street.  This house is, along with the Daniel Payne House on Park Avenue, one of the town's best example of the transitional Federal-Greek Revival style.  The half-round gable windows and transom are Federal in style, while the window treatments are Greek Revival.

See also
National Register of Historic Places listings in Windsor, Connecticut

References

Houses on the National Register of Historic Places in Connecticut
National Register of Historic Places in Hartford County, Connecticut
Federal architecture in Connecticut
Greek Revival architecture in Connecticut
Houses completed in 1830
Houses in Windsor, Connecticut
1830 establishments in Connecticut